The GWR 388 class was a large class of 310 0-6-0 goods locomotives built by the Great Western Railway. They are sometimes referred to as the Armstrong Goods or Armstrong Standard Goods to differentiate from the Gooch Goods and Dean Goods classes, both of which were also large classes of standard goods locomotives.

Use
Despite their description as goods engines, for many years they were also used on passenger trains; the class that principally replaced them was Churchward's mixed-traffic 2-6-0s, the 4300 Class of 1919-21. They were used throughout the GWR system where the gauge permitted; principally in the Northern Division to start with.

War service
While the service overseas of Dean's 2301 Class during two world wars is well known, the service of the 388 Class in World War I is less often documented. Six of the class were sent to Serbia in 1916, two of them returning in 1921; and 16 of them were shipped to Salonika in 1917, though the first batch of eight was lost at sea. After the war four of them entered the stock of the Ottoman Railway; another four were returned to the GWR in 1921.

Numbering
The 388 class were built in several batches between 1866 and 1876; many locomotives were given numbers from recently withdrawn locomotives, so they do not run in a continuous series, or even in order of construction. 

In the following table the "Works Number" is a sequential number allocated by the builder, the "Locomotive number" is the number carried on the locomotive for identification.

Broad gauge
Twenty locomotives were converted to  broad gauge from 1884 and reconverted to standard gauge in 1892.

 1196 (1888 - 1892)
 1197 (1887 - 1892)
 1198 (1888 - 1892)
 1199 (1887 - 1892)
 1200 (1887 - 1892)
 1201 (1888 - 1892)
 1202 (1887 - 1892)
 1203 (1887 - 1892)
 1204 (1888 - 1892)
 1205 (1888 - 1892)

 1206 (1884 - 1892)
 1207 (1884 - 1892)
 1208 (1884 - 1892)
 1209 (1884 - 1892)
 1210 (1884 - 1892)
 1211 (1884 - 1892)
 1212 (1884 - 1892)
 1213 (1884 - 1892)
 1214 (1884 - 1892)
 1215 (1884 - 1892)

Accidents and incidents

Withdrawal
There were numerous withdrawals from around 1920. After 1930 the few survivors were at Oxley, Stourbidge and Wellington, and the last was withdrawn in 1934. As with all Armstrong classes, none was preserved.

References

 
 
 
 
 
 

0388
GWR 0388 Class
GWR 0388 Class
Railway Operating Division locomotives
Railway locomotives introduced in 1866
Standard gauge steam locomotives of Great Britain
Scrapped locomotives
Freight locomotives